Permatang Pauh may refer to:
Permatang Pauh
Permatang Pauh (federal constituency), represented in the Dewan Rakyat
Permatang Pauh (state constituency), formerly represented in the Penang State Legislative Assembly (1959–74)